Aquascypha is a fungal genus in the family Meruliaceae. It is a monotypic genus, containing the single species Aquascypha hydrophora, found in Central and South America. Study of this fungus in the Amazon rainforest showed that on average, these cups hold 35 millitres of water, in addition to organic matter such as leaves, flowers and fruits that fall from trees; this provides an ideal environment for various insect species (especially filter-feeding species like mosquitoes) to breed.

References

Taxa described in 1965
Monotypic Polyporales genera
Meruliaceae
Taxa named by Derek Reid